Paintersville may refer to:

 Paintersville, California, an unincorporated community
 Paintersville, Ohio, an unincorporated community